Buckner Mountain is a summit in Madison County in the U.S. state of Missouri.

Buckner Mountain has the name of Aylette Buckner, an early settler.

References

Mountains of Madison County, Missouri
Mountains of Missouri